The Théâtre de l'Île (Theatre of the Island) is a small municipally run theatre in Gatineau, Quebec, Canada. It is located on a small island at the southern end of the Ruisseau de la Brasserie, a small river running just to the west of Montcalm Street in the former city of Hull. The building was originally constructed in 1886 as the Hull Water Works, at a time when the site was at the heart of a largely industrial area. In the subsequent decades the building served a number of different purposes. In 1974, it suffered a devastating fire. The city of Hull and the National Capital Commission joined together to rebuild the structure as a theatre. It opened in 1976, and was the first municipally run theatre in Quebec.

The theatre seats up to 119. It puts on a number of different shows per year, with some 25,000 spectators per annum.

External links

Théâtre de l'Île collection (R13110) at Library and Archives Canada

Buildings and structures completed in 1886
Buildings and structures in Gatineau
Theatres in Quebec
Tourist attractions in Outaouais
1886 establishments in Canada
1974 establishments in Quebec